The 15th season of Law & Order premiered on NBC with a two-hour premiere on September 22, 2004, and concluded on May 18, 2005. This is the last season to feature Elisabeth Rohm before she was replaced by Annie Parisse

Cast and crew changes
In May 2004, it was announced that Dennis Farina would be replacing Jerry Orbach (Detective Lennie Briscoe) as Detective Joe Fontana. Having moved over to the third Law & Order spin-off, Law & Order: Trial by Jury, Orbach only filmed two episodes of the series before his death in December 2004. 

Assistant District Attorney Serena Southerlyn, played by Elisabeth Röhm, became the first ADA to reach her fourth season on Law & Order.  However, midway through the season it was announced that Röhm wanted to depart the series. Röhm said to MSNBC, "If I had stayed, I don’t think it would have made much sense, and as much as I loved the show I personally had to kind of kick myself out of the crib." she continued, "It was very hard for me to make the decision because my managers and agents wanted me to not even do any of this season." Röhm's last episode was "Ain't No Love" in which her character comes out as a lesbian at the end of the episode.

In December 2004, it was announced that Röhm was replaced by Annie Parisse who began portraying Assistant District Attorney Alexandra Borgia with the episode "Fluency". Parisse said, "I'm so excited to be a part of such a great show. I had so much fun when I did an episode a couple years ago and I'm really looking forward to working with everyone on a regular basis." Creator Dick Wolf said of the casting, "Annie is a terrific actress, and her new character (Alexandra Borgia) is an exotic beauty whose looks belie the fact that she is usually the smartest person in the room." 

Days prior to the news of Annie Parisse joining the cast, it was announced that Jesse L. Martin (Detective Ed Green) would be departing the cast to film Rent. Martin said about his departure, "I am very grateful to everyone at Wolf Films and NBC Universal Television, especially Dick Wolf and Jeff Zucker, for allowing me this once in a lifetime opportunity, I'm going to miss Dennis (Farina), Epatha (Merkerson) and the rest of the cast and crew, and I can't wait to return next year." Dick Wolf added, "For the past six years, Jesse has been an 'actor's actor', an incredible performer, total professional and he is liked by everyone. He had an opportunity to reprise a career-making role that is very important to him, and we wanted to make it work. We look forward to his return to Law & Order for season 16." Martin's last episode of the season was "Tombstone" (a crossover episode with Law & Order: Trial by Jury, episode "Skeleton") in which Green is shot.

Martin was replaced by Michael Imperioli who portrayed Detective Nick Falco starting with the episode "Publish and Perish" until the season finale episode. Imperioli said about his character, Falco, "The character I'm playing on Law & Order, has a real passion for making the world safe and making the city safe for people. He wants to make sure that the bad guys go to jail and that justice wins out and I think he grew up with that reverence and lives with it." 

Roz Weinman is show runner/executive producer with Eric Overmyer over Matthew Penn and Peter Jankowski. Weinman and Overmyer depart the series at the end of the season, replaced by Walon Green and Nicholas Wootton in season 16.

DVD release 
Season fifteen is available on DVD. Initially, it was only available as part of the Law & Order: The Complete Series DVD boxed set, released in November 2011. It was later released separately on November 4, 2014.

Cast

Main cast
 Dennis Farina as Senior Detective Joe Fontana
 Jesse L. Martin as Junior Detective Ed Green (Episodes 1-20)
 Michael Imperioli as Junior Detective Nick Falco (Episodes 21-24)
 S. Epatha Merkerson as Lieutenant Anita Van Buren
 Sam Waterston as Executive Assistant District Attorney Jack McCoy
 Elisabeth Röhm as Assistant District Attorney Serena Southerlyn (Episodes 1-13)
 Annie Parisse as Assistant District Attorney Alexandra Borgia (Episodes 14-24)
 Fred Dalton Thompson as District Attorney Arthur Branch

Recurring cast
 Dann Florek as Captain Don Cragen
 Carolyn McCormick as Dr. Elizabeth Olivet

Episodes

Notes

 The spin-off Law & Order: Trial by Jury premiered this season; it featured Jerry Orbach reprising his role as Lennie Briscoe in his final television appearances before his death in 2004. The episode "Tombstone" is the first half of a cross-over with Law & Order: Trial by Jury episode "Skeleton".

References

External links
 Episode guide from NBC.com

15
2004 American television seasons
2005 American television seasons